Anton Florian (28 May 1656 – 11 October 1721) was the Prince of Liechtenstein between 1718 and 1721.

Anton Florian was born in Wilfersdorf, in what is now Lower Austria. During the War of the Spanish Succession, he went to Spain, where he was the Chief Intendant and Prime Minister of the Archduke Karl, who became Emperor Charles VI after the sudden death of his brother in 1711. Florian returned to Vienna for Charles's coronation. He was the Obersthofmeister (Imperial Chief Intendant) and Chairman of the Secret Council until he died in 1721.

On 23 January 1719, Charles VI created the new principality of Liechtenstein from the domains of Seigneury of Schellenberg and County of Vaduz, which were both held by the Liechtenstein family. This was done so that Anton Florian could be admitted to the Reichstag, which required that all members had land that was subordinate only to the Emperor himself (as opposed to land held in fief by higher nobles). Thus, Anton Florian became the first Prince of Liechtenstein. It is the only monarchy of the Holy Roman Empire that still exists.

Anton Florian was the 591st Knight of the Order of the Golden Fleece in Austria. He died in Vienna in 1721.

Marriage and issue
Anton Florian married Countess Eleonore Barbara Catharina von Thun und Hohenstein (4 May 1661 – 10 February 1723) on 15 October 1679. They had 11 children, most of whom died in early childhood:
 Prince Franz Augustin (1680–1681)
 Princess Eleonore (1681–1682)
 Princess Antonia Maria Eleonore  (12 January 1683 – 19 December 1715)
 Prince Karl Joseph Florian (b. and d. 1685)
 Prince Anton Ignaz Joseph (1689–1690)
 Joseph Johann Adam, Prince of Liechtenstein (27 May 1690 – 17 December 1732)
 Prince Innozenz Franz Anton (1693–1707)
 Princess Maria Karoline Anna (23 August 1694 – 16 April 1735)
 Prince Karl Joseph (1697–1704)
 Princess Anna Maria Antonie (1699–1753); married her cousin, Joseph Wenzel I, Prince of Liechtenstein
 Princess Maria Eleonore (1703 – 18 July 1757); married Count Friedrich August von Harrach-Rohrau

References

External links 
 Princely House of Liechtenstein

1656 births
1721 deaths
People from Mistelbach District
Princes of Liechtenstein
Knights of the Golden Fleece
18th-century Liechtenstein people
Obersthofmeister